Moonrise (full title: Moonrise; One Family, Genetic Identity, And Muscular Dystrophy) is a 2003 book written by Penny Wolfson. The full name refers to her family and her son, Ansel, who struggled throughout life with Duchenne muscular dystrophy. The book was based on an article the author wrote for The Atlantic in 2001, which received a national magazine award.

Plot
As Ansel progresses in life, he gets weaker, and begins to use a wheelchair, but stays much fitter than most with Duchenne. He later goes to Columbia University. After 23 years of living with this disability, Ansel still lives a healthy and productive life.

References

External links
Google Books

Muscular dystrophy